= International lamp coding system =

The international lamp coding system (ILCOS) is defined by IEC 61231, an international standard maintained by the lamp technical committee of the International Electrotechnical Commission. It is intended to provide a well-defined and vendor-independent coding system for all lamp categories except vehicle lamps. The first version of the standard was published in 1993, the most recent update in 2013.

ILCOS defines a short code, ILCOS L, and a standard code, ILCOS D, which provides the complete designation of a lamp.
